Pierre Sévigny may refer to:

 Pierre Sévigny (ice hockey) (born 1971), Canadian ice hockey player 
 Pierre Sévigny (politician) (1917–2004), Canadian politician